
Laguna Alalay is a lake in the Cochabamba Department, Bolivia. At an elevation of 2570 m, its surface area is 2.4 km².  Lake has flood control dam that regulates floods of Rocha River. Lake perimeter, called circuit Bolivia (Circuito Bolivia), features bicycle path and jogging track. Some visitors find lake polluted and unattractive.

See also 
 Warawara Lake

References 

Lakes of Cochabamba Department